Crafty Admiral (June 6, 1948 – 1972) was an American Thoroughbred racehorse who was the 1952 American Champion Older Male Horse and Leading broodmare sire in North America in 1978.

Background
A very late foal, Crafty Admiral's dam, Admiral's Lady, died after producing the colt. He was purchased for $6,500 as a yearling by Hugh Grant at a special auction of Harry Guggenheim horses held in the paddock at Belmont Park. In late 1951, Grant sold him to Charles and Frances Cohen, a husband-and-wife team who raced under the name of Charfran Stable.

Racing career
Crafty Admiral set a new track record for seven furlongs in winning the 1952 Palm Beach Handicap at Hialeah Park Race Track.

At stud
Retired to stud in Kentucky in 1954, Crafty Admiral sired twenty-six stakes winners including Crafty Lace, Crafty Khale and Admiral's Voyage who was the damsire of Danzig.  Through his daughter, Won't Tell You, he is the damsire of 1978 U.S. Triple Crown champion Affirmed whose earnings help make Crafty Admiral that year's Leading broodmare sire in North America.

Pedigree

References

1948 racehorse births
1972 racehorse deaths
Racehorses bred in Kentucky
Racehorses trained in the United States
Horse racing track record setters
American Champion racehorses
American Champion Thoroughbred broodmare sires
Thoroughbred family 8-c